Dundee Corporation is a public Canadian independent holding company based in Toronto, Ontario, Canada. Through its operating subsidiaries, Dundee Corporation is an active investor focused on delivering long‐term, sustainable value from investments in the mining sector. It is listed on the Toronto Stock Exchange under the symbol “DC.A”.

Dundee Corporation was founded in 1991 by Canadian entrepreneur made billionaire, Ned Goodman and built a track record as a successful mining investor. During this period, Dundee Corporation had many high-profile mining investments, including: 

 Homestake Mining; sold to Barrick;
 Seed investor of Kinross Gold;
 Founding investor of Repadre Capital Corporation; sold to Iamgold;
 Zemex Minerals;
 Breakwater Resources;
 Founding shareholder of Dundee Precious Metals Inc.;
 Founding investor in Osisko Mining;
 Raised $4.3 billion in flow-through limited partnerships helping to discover some of Canada’s best orebodies.

In 2011, Dundee Corporation’s focus expanded to businesses beyond the mining sector. In order to bring Dundee Corporation back to its roots as a mining investment and merchant bank business, Jonathan Goodman returned to Dundee Corporation as Chairman and CEO in 2018 to create Dundee 2.0. The goal of Dundee 2.0 is to re-recreate the culture and structure that led to Dundee Corporation’s past success in the mining business.

Dundee 2.0’s long-term plan involves operating three mining investment and finance businesses:

Dundee Mining (Private Equity Style) – This is the technical team that does the detailed work on the larger investments. The team’s due diligence and de-risking approach focuses on all aspects of the mining business and thoroughly evaluates potential investments and make deliberate, long-term decisions. Once due diligence is complete, they work closely with the Merchant Banking team to structure and implement the deal in a way so that they receive a commission. The team currently has a healthy pipeline of investment opportunities in their portfolio they are evaluating.

Dundee Goodman Merchant Partners – Dundee Goodman Merchant Partners (“DGMP”) operates as a combination of investor and broker. DGMP focuses on the emerging side of the mining business and makes small investments in select, undervalued companies. DGMP is usually paid in commissions and broker warrants. Since launching this strategy in June 2020, this group has been profitable.

CMP (Flow-Through Fund) – The flow through fund business which raises money from Canadians who need tax deductions generated from mineral exploration. This was once a major area of strength for Dundee, which helped companies raise over $4.3 billion. Dundee has a new structure that can give even more tax deductions to the investors, and expects it will result in regaining market share and increasing profitability.

Sources

External links
 Dundee Corporation Official Website

Companies listed on the Toronto Stock Exchange
Investment management companies of Canada